John Conte may refer to:

 John Conte (politician) (born 1930), American politician in Massachusetts
 John Conte (actor)  (1915–2006), American actor and television station owner